Leptodactylus caatingae is a species of frog in the family Leptodactylidae. It is endemic to the Caatinga region of northeastern Brazil and known from Espirito Santo, Paraíba, and Bahia states. Prior to its description it was included in Leptodactylus latinasus.
Its natural habitat is dry Caatinga savanna; other aspects of its ecology are unknown. Potential threats to it are overgrazing and fires.

References

caatingae
Endemic fauna of Brazil
Amphibians of Brazil
Taxonomy articles created by Polbot
Amphibians described in 2003